Karnachi (also Romanized as Karnāchī; also known as Karnājī) is a village in Miyan Darband Rural District, in the Central District of Kermanshah County, Kermanshah Province, Iran. At the 2006 census, its population was 4,644, in 1,117 families.

References 

Populated places in Kermanshah County